

Henry Worrall (1825-1902) was an American visual artist and musician in Ohio and Kansas in the 19th century. Born in Liverpool, England, he moved to the U.S. in the 1830s, working as "a newsboy in New York and Cincinnati."  In Ohio he taught guitar at the Ohio Female College and co-founded the Cincinnati Sketch Club. He settled in Topeka in 1868 and may have been "the only regular subscriber to the London Punch in Kansas." Worrall designed the landscaping of Washburn College; and the Kansas exhibits at the Philadelphia Centennial in 1876, and the World's Columbian Exposition in 1893. Some of his musical compositions were published by Oliver Ditson in Boston and J.L. Peters & Bros. in St. Louis. He died in Kansas in 1902.

References

Further reading

Works by Worrall
 
  Illustrations by Worrall on p.273 and p.303.

About Worrall
  Describes Worrall's wood carving of the Kansas state seal.

External links

 WorldCat. Worrall, Henry 1825-1902
 Kansas Historical Society. Henry Worrall Collection

1825 births
1902 deaths
American male composers
American composers
English emigrants to the United States
Artists from Cincinnati
Artists from Liverpool
Artists from Topeka, Kansas
19th-century male musicians
19th-century musicians